Pieter Meert (name variations: Petrus Meert, Peeter Meert, Peeter Meerte, Pieter Meerte, Peeter Merten, Petrus Meerte) (c. 1620 – 1669) was a Flemish Baroque painter known for his portraits and genre paintings.

He was born in Brussels.  The early Flemish biographer Cornelis De Bie reports in his Het Gulden Cabinet published in 1662 that Meert was well known as a portrait painter, who imitated the style of Anthony van Dyck. According to the Dutch biographer Arnold Houbraken he was a good portrait painter whose works hung in various guild halls in Brussels.

Peter Capuyns was his pupil.

References

Sources

Flemish Baroque painters
Flemish portrait painters
1620 births
1669 deaths
Artists from Brussels
17th-century Flemish painters